The Ouachita Baptist Tigers football program is the intercollegiate American football team for Ouachita Baptist University located in the U.S. state of Arkansas. The team competes in NCAA Division II and are members of the Great American Conference. Ouachita Baptist's first football team was fielded in 1896. The team plays its home games at Cliff Harris  Stadium / Benson-Williams Field in Arkadelphia, Arkansas. The Tigers are coached by Todd Knight.

History
The Tiger football team is notable for participating in the first ever Intercollegiate game in Arkansas history, a 24-0 win over the Arkansas Razorbacks in the fall of 1897. The Ouachita Baptist Tigers compete in the Battle of the Ravine every year. This tradition started in 1895 when Ouachita Baptist played Arkadelphia Methodist College (currently known as Henderson State University), and won 8-0. This historical event was not played from 1951 to 1963 because of the excessive rivalry between the two schools. It resumed after 1963 and is still being played to this day.

Conference Affiliations 

 Independent (1897, 1906 - 1926, 1928 - 1930)
 No Team (1898 - 1905, 1943 - 1944)
 Arkansas Association (1927)
 Arkansas Intercollegiate Conference (1931 - 1942, 1945 - 1994)
 NAIA Independent (1995 - 1996)
 Lone Star Conference (1997 - 1999)
 Gulf South Conference (2000 - 2010)
 Great American Conference (2011 - present)

Notable former players

Formerly in the NFL
 Carl Allen, RB/DB, Brooklyn Dodgers	
 Cliff Harris, DB, Dallas Cowboys
 Gregory Junior, DB, Jacksonville Jaguars
 Bill LaFitte, E, Brooklyn Tigers
 Ed Neal, OL, Green Bay Packers	
 Julius Pruitt, WR, Miami Dolphins
 Chuck Taylor, LB, Brooklyn Tigers
 Chris Rycraw, RB, Green Bay Packers
 Augustine Ume-Ezeoke, DB, New York Jets
 Phillip Supernaw, TE, Tennessee Titans

Year-by-year results

Championships

Conference championships 

*Indicates co-championship

Rivalries

Henderson State

References

External links
 

 
American football teams established in 1896
1896 establishments in Arkansas